Ionatana Tino is a Samoan rugby league and rugby union footballer who represented Samoa in the 2013 World Cup.

Playing career
A player for the Apia Barracudas in the Samoan local competition, Tino played for the Parkes Spacemen in the Group 11 Rugby League competition during the 2013 season.

In 2013, Tino was named in the Samoa squad for the World Cup.

He played for the Samoan rugby league nines side at the 2015 Pacific Games.

References

Living people
Parkes Spacemen players
Rugby league hookers
Rugby league locks
Samoa national rugby league team players
Samoa international rugby union players
Place of birth missing (living people)
1990 births